Distant Populations is the fourth studio album by American post-hardcore band Quicksand. The album was released digitally on August 13, 2021 through Epitaph Records.

Background
The band's previous studio album, Interiors, was released on November 10, 2017 and was the band's first release since 1995's Manic Compression. In 2018, Quicksand released an EP titled Triptych Continuum on 12-inch vinyl for Record Store Day.

On April 13, 2021, the band released the single "Inversion", but did not announce a new album at the time. On June 23, the band released another single, "Missile Command", and announced a new album, Distant Populations, set to be released digitally on August 13 with a vinyl edition following on September 24.

Musical style
Distant Populations has been described as post-hardcore, alternative metal, hard rock and alternative rock.

Track listing

Personnel
Quicksand
Walter Schreifels – vocals, guitar
Sergio Vega – bass
Alan Cage – drums

Production
Will Yip – engineer, producer
Ted Jensen – mastering
Josh Wilbur – mixing
Tetsunori Tawaraya – artwork
Jason Link – layout

Charts

References

2021 albums
Quicksand (band) albums
Epitaph Records albums
Albums produced by Will Yip